Beany and Cecil is a 1962 animated television series created by Bob Clampett for the American Broadcasting Company. The cartoon was based on the television puppet show Time for Beany, which Clampett produced for Paramount Pictures company and its Paramount Television Network beginning 1949. The series was broadcast first as part of the series Matty's Funday Funnies during 1959, later renamed Matty's Funnies with Beany and Cecil, and finally Beany and Cecil in the United States. Another season was produced during 1988.

Although a children's show, it incorporated satirical references to current events and personalities that adults found entertaining, and the show also attracted adult viewers. Some of the plots and remarks were recognizable as lampoons of current political issues.

Along with The Jetsons and The Flintstones, it was one of the first three color television series by the ABC television network (the initial season, though, was originally shown in black and white, as ABC was unable to broadcast color programs until September 1962).

History
Beany and Cecil was created by animator Bob Clampett after he quit Warner Bros., where he had been directing short cartoon movies. Clampett allegedly originated the idea for Cecil when he was a boy after seeing the top half of the dinosaur swimming from the water at the end of the 1925 movie The Lost World.

Clampett originally created the idea as a television series named Time for Beany, which was broadcast from February 28, 1949, to 1955. Time for Beany, a puppet show, featured the talents of veteran voice actors Stan Freberg as Cecil and Dishonest John, and Daws Butler as Beany and Uncle Captain.

Clampett revived the series in theatrical animated form, though Freberg and Butler did not reprise their roles. On 11 October 1959, the animated series was introduced as Matty's Funday Funnies. named for "Matty Mattel" the animated spokesperson for its primary sponsor Mattel Toys company. However, the series at that time featured old Paramount theatrical cartoons. The new Beany and Cecil cartoon series took over Matty's Funnies (sans "Funday") in January 1962 and was broadcast prime time Saturdays during the remainder of the 1961-62 television season, by the ABC Television Network. The newer cartoons replaced the Famous Studios cartoons of Casper the Friendly Ghost and Little Audrey among other parts of Matty's Funday Funnies. The program was later retitled The Beany and Cecil Show.
 
After 1962, the 26 shows (including 78 cartoons) were repeated during Saturday mornings for the next two years and on Sunday mornings for three more. The cartoon featured characters Beany, a boy, and Cecil the Sea-Sick Sea Serpent embarking on a series of adventures, often to discover ancient civilizations and artifacts. These escapades were rife with cartoon slapstick and puns.

Before the animated series, but concurrent with the puppet show, Clampett created a comic-book series of Beany and Cecil adventures for Dell Comics. The artwork for this series of comics, published from 1951–54, was drawn by Jack Bradbury.

In 1988, the show was revived as The New Adventures of Beany and Cecil by DiC Entertainment. Only eight episodes were made, and only five episodes broadcast. This version of the show was produced and directed by John Kricfalusi, who would later create The Ren and Stimpy Show, and made use of voices from Billy West, who also did voices for the characters Ren (for season 3 and later) and Stimpy.

Characters

Main characters
 Beany Boy – a young, cupid-faced boy with a propeller beanie cap that allows him to fly (the "Beanycopter", complete with helmet and propeller, became a popularly marketed novelty). Beany is a good-hearted lad. In most episodes, Beany would be kidnapped by a villain or get caught in a rough situation, crying "Help, Cecil! Help!" to which Cecil would reply "I'm a-comin', Beany-boy!" as he raced to the rescue. This has become something of a catchphrase. Beany was originally voiced by Jim MacGeorge for the 1960s series and by Mark Hildreth for the 1980s series.

 Cecil (or "Cecil the Seasick Sea Serpent") – a large green sea serpent with a slight lisp. He is fiercely loyal to Beany, but he is not very clever. Cecil's trusting good nature invariably results in him being taken advantage of by the bad people, and he often suffers a great amount of physical abuse (getting smashed flat, losing his head, having his skin burned off, being shattered to pieces), examples of cartoon physics. The end of Cecil's tail was never seen in most episodes; it always extended off-screen or was hidden behind an obstacle. This is likely a joking reference to the original Cecil, a hand puppet whose tail was likewise hidden (because it didn't exist). His neck often showed folds and creases like that of a sock puppet as well, another reference to the original Cecil. Cecil's tail did appear in "Beany and the Jackstalk" when his entire body became wound into the tension spring of a giant cuckoo clock. Cecil also has a superhero alter-ego known as Super-Cecil. In this guise, he wears a modified Superman shirt (complete with cape). It was Cecil who sang "A Bob Clam-pett car-tooooooo-OOOOOOOOON!" at the end of the opening song of each episode. Cecil was voiced originally by Irv Shoemaker for the 1960s cartoon and by Billy West for the 1980s cartoon.
 Captain Horatio Huffenpuff – also called "Uncle Captain", he is Beany's kindly uncle and the captain of the ship Leakin' Lena, which takes the pals from one destination to the other. The Captain is always willing to instruct Beany and Cecil on their latest assignment, but is rather cowardly and refuses to put himself in any personal jeopardy, locking himself below the deck or under a box labeled "Capt. Huffenpuff's Hiding Box" for most of the episodes. Uncle Captain was voiced by Jim MacGeorge for both series.
 Crowy – the navigator of the ship Leakin' Lena. He is a crow, and unsurprisingly spends most of his time in the ship's crow's nest. He speaks with a squawky voice and tends to faint whenever the ship encounters some sort of hazard. Crowy was voiced by Jim MacGeorge (though Don Messick did so in one episode).
 Dishonest John (or "D.J.") – a mobster villain and the main antagonist of the show. He is dressed formally like a Simon Legree character, and he is constantly scheming to foil Beany and Cecil's adventures. His catchphrase is his sinister laugh, "Nya-ah-ãhh!", and he occasionally refers to Cecil as a "tall toad", "worm" or "big salami" (referring to his big, limbless body). Whenever Dishonest John's schemes are revealed to the heroes, Cecil tends to respond with an aghast "What the heck! D.J., you dirty guy!". When Dishonest John receives his inevitable defeat, it is usually just as painful as the abuse Cecil has endured during the rest of the episode. Dishonest John also has a supervillain alter-ego known as The Bilious Beetle. In this guise, he can fly by his power and has a painful stinger. "D.J." also appeared disguised on occasion as the mechanical robotic octopus "Billy The Squid" usually in haphazard attempts to simulate sea storms to scare away the crew of the Leakin' Lena when on a treasure hunt. Dishonest John carried a business card that read: "Dirty deeds done dirt cheap. Special rates for Sundays and holidays". This was the inspiration for the AC/DC song "Dirty Deeds Done Dirt Cheap". In the 1980s series, one episode revealed that DJ is a member of a club called the Brotherhood of B.L.E.C.H. (short for Bad Guys, Losers, Evildoers, Crooks, and Horrible People). DJ was originally voiced by Irv Shoemaker for the 1960s series and by Maurice LaMarche for the 1980s series.

Minor characters
 Cecilia McCoy - a she-serpent and Cecil's girlfriend. In the two-episode arc, Beany Blows His Top & Beany Flips His Lid, Dishonest John attempts to sabotage their relationship by disguising himself as another sea serpent named Rex.
 Davey Cricket – a cricket with a coonskin cap who lives in the backwoods of Eight-Nine-Tennessee. The character is a parody of Walt Disney's wildly popular segments on the Disneyland television show based on the life of American frontiersman Davey Crockett. In Cricket's self-titled episode, Dishonest John tries unsuccessfully to sign Davey to a lucrative Hollywood movie contract. He appeared in the episodes: Davey Cricket & Davey Cricket's Leading Ladybug.
 Go Man Van Gogh – a stereotypical cartoon beatnik/wild man who lives in the jungles of Wildsville on the Hungry I-Land. He often paints various things with his paintbrush, including paintings, vines to swing on, and fake backdrops to fool enemies (ala Wile E. Coyote and the Road Runner). He also often plays a set of bongo drums, does scat singing, and speaks with various beatnik stereotype slang. Though he did not appear in many episodes, he was somewhat recurring. He was voiced originally by Lord Buckley in "The Wildman of Wildsville" (a 1959 short movie that was later broadcast as part of the television series) and then by Scatman Crothers after Buckley's death in 1960.
 Harecules Hare - a rabbit with superior intelligence. Hare had a computerized Thinking Cap and built a "Guided Muscle", a guided missile with a nose-cone in the form of a giant fist. He appeared in the episodes Ben Hare and Harecules Hare and the Golden Fleecing.
 Ben Hare - a rabbit and father to Harecules. He was a muscular health nut who believed that brawn was more important than brains and wished that his son would feel the same way. He appeared in the episodes Ben Hare and Harecules Hare and the Golden Fleecing.
 Jacques the Knife (or "Jack the Knife") – a friendly, jazz-singing sawfish with a heavy French accent. His name was an obvious spoof of Bobby Darin's 1959 hit song "Mack the Knife". His sawlike nose is used as a sword to help Cecil defeat Dishonest John in the episode "Hero by Trade". He spoke only in song, to a rendition of "Oh My Darling, Clementine" done in the styling Bobby Darin's version of the song. He also comes to Cecil's aid in the episode The Monstrous Monster.
 Little Ace From Outer Space – an astronaut mouse. In his self-titled episode, he was used by the people at Cape Banana Peel to discover "whether or whether there was any weather". Cecil and Dishonest John competed to get Little Ace back to the cape for a cash reward. In the episode "Rat Race From Space", he was sent in a rocket to be the first mouse on the moon only to end up in the ocean. He was voiced by Paul Frees.
 The Dreaded Three-Headed Threep
 Tear-A-Long the Dotted Lion – a muscle-bound lion obsessed with exercise and vitamins, a possible parody of fitness guru Jack La Lanne, who had a popular television exercise show about the same time as Beany and Cecil. His name is a pun of the phrase "Tear along the dotted line", but Tear-A-Long himself wasn't spotted. He spoke with a Southern U.S. accent similar to the Warner Brothers animated character Foghorn Leghorn. One of the original characters on the Time for Beany puppet show, the character was voiced by Daws Butler.
 Careless the Mexican Hairless – Cecil's jovial pet Chihuahua, introduced in the episode "Cecil Gets Careless" and so named because of his tendency to knock things over when he happily jumps and dances. He sings to the tune of the Mexican folk song "El Jarabe Tapatio". He is called a Mexican Hairless for comic effect; the actual breed aka Xoloitzcuintli is much larger.
 William Shakespeare Wolf – a starving out-of-work wolf and actor who was a foil for Rin Tin Can (a robot dog whose rise to fame coincided with the demise of his own acting career) as well as Harecules Hare and a duck named Graham Quacker, both of whom he attempted to eat.
 Beepin' Tom – a diminutive alien who flew about in an open-top flying saucer.  He is named for his habit of making beeping sounds. When he spoke, he would hum the first line of The Alphabet Song and then sing his phrase to the tune of the next line. A high pitched, accelerated voice similar to the Chipmunks was used for the character and the words he sang/spoke appeared as a rebus in a word balloon over his head. He appeared in the episodes Ain't I a Little Stinger? and Strange Objects.
 Hopalong Catskill – a frog wearing a cowboy hat who walked with a limp similar to that of Dennis Weaver's "Chester" on the TV show Gunsmoke and spoke with a Yiddish accent. His catchphrase was "Hey Shmendrick! Would you like a cup of coffee?" The character was voiced by Yiddish comedy singer Mickey Katz.
 Peking Tom – a Siamese alley cat who sang about being a "very hungry guy; I've got to get some food 'cause I'm too egg-foo-young to die".
 Cora the Clinging Vine (aka Flora) – a voluptuous vine who has a crush on Cecil (who does not reciprocate her advances). She sings "groovy" and Jazz scats to Cecil as he tries to escape from her. She appeared in the episodes Wildman From Wildsville and Capture of the Three-Headed Threep.
 Venus the Meanest and Venice the Menace – two space robots from Venus who at first were reported to be invading Earth but came down for a picnic. Venice the Menace's name is a play on Dennis the Menace (both the British and American versions), and acts like Linus Van Pelt from Peanuts including his thumb sucking and "dirty old" blanket.
 The Robot Ants – a group of ants brought by Venus the Meanest to be part of her picnic on Earth. They sing a march based on the children's song "This Old Man" that is shown in a speech bubble.
 The Boo Birds – a gang of mischievous ghost birds that haunt an abandoned castle where Cecil stayed. They sing a tune "Filet of Soul (Sole)" based on the song "When the Saints Come Marching In". Their catchphrase was "Whyyyy not?"
 Edgar Allen Po's Shadow – a shadow man who owns the Haunted Retreat Mansion in the episode Beany and Cecil meets the Invisible Man. He is based on Alfred Hitchcock and speaks with an accent like that of the cartoon character Elmer Fudd.
 So What and the Seven What-Knots – a dixie jazz band who performed in a jazz club in Las Vegas, Nevada to the tune of "When the Saints Come Marching In". They are based on the fairy tale, Snow White and the Seven Dwarfs. The names of the 'What-Knots' all spoofed on musicians & actors of the day, such as $tash-do (Satchmo), Elfis (Elvis Presley), Dizzy R. Nez (Desi Arnaz), Harpsie McChord (Harpo Marx), Fred McFurry (Fred MacMurray), Screw-Loose Lautrec (Henri de Toulouse-Lautrec) & Loverachi (Liberace).
 Stogie Bear – a detective bear who Beany and Cecil helped to arrest the gangster bears in the episode, The Warring 20's.
 Double Trouble Bubble Beast – a weird underwater creature who appeared in Ain't That a Cork in the Snorkel and Make a Sea-Serpent Sore!
 Dinah Saur, The Singing Dinosaur - a dinosaur named and patterned after Dinah Shore who lived on the island of No Bikini Atoll & sang to the tune of "When the Saints Come Marching In". 
 Gigi - a french poodle. Featured in the episode DJ The DJ, she repeatedly thought she was being summoned by Cecil each time he would utter the "R-A-G-G" portion of the song "Rag Mop".
 Baby Ruthy - Beany's girlfriend, appears in Beany Blows His Top & Beany Flips His Lid. As he leaves to meet her, Huffenpuff tells him "You dine ashore..." (yet another Dinah Shore reference).
 Bridget the Crow - Crowy's girlfriend, she appears in Beany Blows His Top.
 U.S. Male - a postal ship, boyfriend of the Leakin' Lena, appears in Beany Blows His Top.
 Ida - Sweet as apple cider. Huffenpuff's girlfriend,  she appears in just one episode, but is referenced in others.
 The Fleastone Cops - the assisted Detective Fido Vance when The Pincher kidnapped actress Bridgette Bow Wow.
 Snorky - a mischievous serpent tied to many dubious historical events.

Music
Cecil often sang the Ames Brothers' song "Rag Mop" throughout the series. One episode ("Beanyland") featured Tchaikovsky's well-known celesta piece, Dance of the Sugarplum Fairy, from The Nutcracker. Other famed pieces of The Nutcracker were used in the series as musical interludes such as the Chinese Dance and Dance of the Reed-Flutes. Many other well-known classical music pieces were featured in the show as well, including The William Tell Overture (in the episodes "Beanyland" and "The Phantom of the Horse Opera"), Ride of the Valkyries and Flight of the Bumblebee. Some of the background music was also recycled from Leave it to Beaver, as well as some early Walter Lantz cartoons and incidental music from The Alvin Show. "The Can Can" was used in the episode Harecules Hare & The Golden Fleecing as the music for the Guided Muscle. The tune of "When The Saints Come Marching In" was used in several episodes, by the Singing Dinosaur, So What & The Seven What-Knots & the Boo Birds.

Influence
The AC/DC song "Dirty Deeds Done Dirt Cheap" is titled after the business cards of character Dishonest John, which read "Dirty deeds done dirt cheap. Holidays, Sundays and special rates".

Bob Dylan painted Beany in his 2017 Beaten Path painting Hamburger Stand, Long Beach, based on a home movie of Beany's Drive-in Restaurant in 1952.

Marvel Comics has a minor character code-named Warstar who is two separate aliens named "B'nee" and "C'cil".

The puppet origins and the form of Cecil inspired the famous science fiction author Larry Niven to invent an important extraterrestrial race called Pierson's Puppeteer as part of his Known Space series of novels and short stories (as originally stated in the story "The Soft Weapon". Beany and Cecil was also an inspiration for Joel Hodgson to create the show Mystery Science Theater 3000.

The artists
 Executive Producer: A.C.R. Stone
 Producer: Bob Clampett
 Animation Directors: Jack Hannah, Dick Kinney
 Story Material/Storyboards: Bob Clampett, Eddie Maxwell, Al Bertino, Jack Bonestell, Dale Hale, Lloyd Turner (Get Smart writer)
 Layout: Terrell Stapp, Willie Ito, Tony Sgroi, Homer Jonas
 Master Animator: Art Scott
 Animators: Lou Appet, Harry "Bud" Hester, Bill Nunes, Al Stetter, Frank Gonzales, Bill Southwood, Carl A. Bell
 Backgrounds: Curtiss Perkins, Robert Abrams, Marie Reed
 Music Underscore: Bob Clampett, Sody Clampett, Hoyt Curtin, Jack Roberts
 Music Published by Merrifield Music Co., Inc. (ASCAP)
 Production Assistants: Dick Elliott, John Soh, Jeanne Thorpe, Mike Sweeten
 Voice Talents of Jim MacGeorge, Irv Shoemaker and Bob Clampett as Cecil.
 A Bob Clampett Production, in association with Television Artists and Producers Corporation

The credits of the series did not show traditional job titles, but pictorial symbols indicating their jobs. Bob Clampett's writing credit was indicated by a typewriter typing out the words "...by Bob Clampett", for instance. Clampett also made sure to include his name in the lyrics of the often-repeated B&C theme song to gain more recognition with viewers and from the animation industry. Clampett finally got the rights from ABC to market his Beany and Cecil cartoons by video during the 1980s.

Episodes

Home video
The entire series was released on VHS and Betamax as thirteen volumes (each containing two episodes) by RCA Columbia Pictures Home Video in 1984, with the final releases issued by their "Magic Window" children's subsidiary imprint.

Image Entertainment released "Bob Clampett's Beany and Cecil the Special Edition" DVD in 2000, with 12 cartoon shorts and various show bumpers remastered from their original 35mm camera negatives. Bonus features included four complete episodes of Time for Beany, audio tracks of original story sessions, backstage footage, lost animated works from Bob Clampett's studio, and a still gallery. After a considerable delay, Volume 2 was released by Hen's Tooth Entertainment during 2009, containing 11 cartoon shorts, plus two more Time for Beany episodes, archival audio interviews with Bob Clampett, video interviews with celebrity fans of the series as well as animator Bill Melendez, original bumpers from Matty's Funday Funnies and other special features. To date, the entire cartoon collection has not been released on DVD or Blu-Ray disc, nor has it been made available for digital download.

References

External links
 Beany and Cecil DVD Website
 Beany and Cecil at Toon Tracker
 Beany and Cecil at Toonopedia
 

American children's animated comedy television series
English-language television shows
American Broadcasting Company original programming
Television series by Famous Studios
1960s American animated television series
1962 American television series debuts
1962 American television series endings
Animated television series about children
Animated television series about dragons
Television series created by Bob Clampett